Many glacial erratic boulders (often simply called glacial erratics) can be found in the Puget Sound region as far south as the Yelm area where the Puget Lobe of the glacier reached its maximum extent.

The Pleistocene ice age glaciation of Puget Sound created many of the geographical features of the region, including Puget Sound itself, and the erratics are one of the remnants of that age. According to Nick Zentner of Central Washington University Department of Geological Sciences, "Canadian rocks [are] strewn all over the Puget lowland, stretching from the Olympic Peninsula clear over to the Cascade Range." The soil of Seattle, the state's largest city, is approximately 80% glacial drift, most of which is Vashon glacial deposits (till), and nearly all of the city's major named hills are characterized as drumlins (Beacon Hill, First Hill, Capitol Hill, Queen Anne Hill) or drift uplands (Magnolia, West Seattle). Boulders greater than 3 meters in diameter are "rare" in the Vashon till, but can be found, as seen in the table below.

List of erratics

A few of the larger or otherwise most notable erratics can be found in this table. More erratics are noted in the area-specific lists in the navigation box.

References

External links

Washington glacial erratics project at University of Washington dept. of earth and space sciences

+Puget sound region
Landforms of Puget Sound